Jason Randolph Rader (born April 12, 1981) is an American football tight end who used to be a member of the Atlanta Falcons. He was signed by the Atlanta Falcons as an undrafted free agent in 2004. He played college football at Marshall.

Rader has also been a member of the Miami Dolphins and New England Patriots.

Early years
Rader attended high school at St. Albans High School in St. Albans, West Virginia. He signed with coach Jim Donnan in 1999 at the University of Georgia, and caught two passes for 31 yards in the 2000 season. Rader transferred to Marshall University, sitting out in 2001. In 2002-03, he caught 30 passes each year, piling up 553 yards and 5 touchdowns, helping the Herd to an upset of No. 6 Kansas State as a senior in 2003 and finished with an 8-4 season. In 2002, he caught 30 passes from Byron Leftwich and Stan Hill in leading the Herd to the Mid-American Conference title and a GMAC Bowl win over Louisville, 38-15, in Mobile, Ala. as Marshall finished 11-2 that season.

Professional career

First stint with Falcons
Rader was signed as an undrafted free agent by the Atlanta Falcons, but was released at the conclusion of training camp. He had a workout for the San Francisco 49ers in October but spent the year out of football.

Miami Dolphins
In the spring, Rader played with the Rhein Fire of NFL Europa, catching 21 passes for 189 yards. In June, he signed a two-year deal with the Miami Dolphins. Though he was released at the end of training camp, he spent the final eight games of the season on the team's practice squad.

Rader was re-signed by the team in January 2006. He was waived the following September, but re-signed to the practice squad. A few weeks later on September 16, Rader was signed to the Dolphins' active roster. He played five games (including one start) and accumulated no statistics before being released on November 8.

The Dolphins signed Rader to a future contract in January. He was released on August 27.

New England Patriots
Rader was signed to the Patriots' practice squad on September 3 after a tryout with the team on August 31.

He was released in late September.

Second stint with Atlanta
On March 14, 2008, Rader re-signed with the Atlanta Falcons after last playing with the team in the 2004 preseason. He was released by the team during final cuts on August 30, but re-signed on September 17 after the team waived tight end Martrez Milner.

Rader remained with the Falcons until October 29, when he was released to make room for re-signed offensive tackle Wayne Gandy. Rader had appeared in six games for the Falcons, catching one pass. Rader re-signed with the Falcons on December 8.

On April 24, 2010, Jason Rader announced that he was retiring.

References

External links
New England Patriots bio
tsn.ca

1981 births
Living people
American football tight ends
Atlanta Falcons players
Georgia Bulldogs football players
Marshall Thundering Herd football players
Miami Dolphins players
New England Patriots players
People from St. Albans, West Virginia
Players of American football from West Virginia
Rhein Fire players